Hong Kong competed at the 2000 Summer Olympics in Sydney, Australia under the name Hong Kong, China for the first time, as these were the first Games after the territory's handover from the United Kingdom to China in 1997. 31 athletes competed across 9 sports; Chiang Wai Hung, Ho Kwan Lung, Tang Hon Sing, William To Wai Lok and Maggie Chan Man Yee in athletics, Tam Kai Chuen, Ng Wei, Koon Wai Chee Louisa and Ling Wanting in badminton, Yueng Alexandra Ka-Wah and Wong Kam Po in cycling, Yu Yuet in diving, Lo Sing Yan, Lui Kam Chi and Fenella Ng in rowing, Chi Ho Ho and Lee Lai Shan in sailing, Li Hao Jian in shooting, Mark Kin Ming Kwok, Matthew Hon Ming Kwok, Tam Chi Kin, Lik Sun Fong, Wing Harbeth Fu, Hiu Wai Sherry Tsai, Yan Kay Flora Kong, Chan Wing Suet and Caroline Sin Wing Chiu in swimming, and Cheung Yuk, Leung Chu Yan, Song Ah Sim and Wong Ching in table tennis. No Hong Kong athlete won a medal in any event.

Athletics

Track

Badminton

Singles

Doubles

Cycling

Cross country

Track cycling

Diving

Rowing

Sailing

Hong Kong sent one man and one woman to the Sailing competition at the 2000 Sydney Olympics.

Men

Women

M = Medal race; OCS = On course side of the starting line; DSQ = Disqualified; DNF = Did not finish; DNS= Did not start; RDG = Redress given

Shooting

Men

Swimming 

Hong Kong swimmers earned qualifying standards in the following events (up to a maximum of 2 swimmers in each event at the A-standard time, and 1 at the B-standard time):

Men

Women

Table tennis

Men

Women

References
Wallechinsky, David (2004). The Complete Book of the Summer Olympics (Athens 2004 Edition). Toronto, Canada. .
International Olympic Committee (2001). The Results. Retrieved 12 November 2005.
Sydney Organising Committee for the Olympic Games (2001). Official Report of the XXVII Olympiad Volume 1: Preparing for the Games. Retrieved 20 November 2005.
Sydney Organising Committee for the Olympic Games (2001). Official Report of the XXVII Olympiad Volume 2: Celebrating the Games. Retrieved 20 November 2005.
Sydney Organising Committee for the Olympic Games (2001). The Results. Retrieved 20 November 2005.
International Olympic Committee Web Site

External links
Hong Kong

Nations at the 2000 Summer Olympics
2000 Summer Olympics
2000 in Hong Kong sport